George I or 1 may refer to:

People
 Patriarch George I of Alexandria (fl. 621–631)
 George I of Constantinople (d. 686)
 George I of Antioch (d. 790)
 George I of Abkhazia (ruled 872/3–878/9)
 George I of Georgia (d. 1027)
 Yuri Dolgorukiy (c. 1099–1157), George I of Kiev/Russia
 George I of Duklja, King of Duklja (1113-1118) and again (1125-1131)
 George I of Bulgaria (d. 1308/9)
 Yuri I of Galicia (c. 1252–1308)
 George I of Imereti (fl. late 1300s)
 George I, Prince of Anhalt-Dessau (c. 1390–1474)
 George VIII of Georgia (1417–1476), George I of Kakheti
 George I of Münsterberg (1470–1502)
 George I of Brieg (c. 1482–1521)
 George I, Duke of Pomerania (1493–1531)
 George I of Württemberg-Mömpelgard (1498–1558)
 George I, Landgrave of Hesse-Darmstadt (1547–1596)
 George I Rákóczi (1593–1648), prince of Transylvania
 George I of Great Britain (1660–1727), also Elector of Hanover
 George I, Duke of Saxe-Meiningen (1761–1803)
 George I (Miskito) (d. 1777)
 George, King of Saxony (1832–1904)
 George I of Greece (1845–1913)

Other uses
GEORGE 1, version of GEORGE operating system

See also
 George Tupou I of Tonga (c. 1797–1893)
 King George (disambiguation)